Apostolos Antonopoulos (born June 7, 1983) is a Greek former swimmer, who specialized in freestyle events. He won a total of two medals, silver and bronze, in the 400 and 800 m freestyle relays at the 2005 Mediterranean Games in Almería, Spain.

Antonopoulos qualified for the men's 4 × 200 m freestyle relay, as a member of the host nation team, at the 2004 Summer Olympics in Athens. Teaming with Nikolaos Xylouris, Andreas Zisimos, and Dimitrios Manganas, Antonopoulos swam a lead-off leg in a split of 1:50.34, but the Greeks rounded out the finale to last place with a final time of 7:23.02, more than 15 seconds off the winning mark set by Team USA.

References

External links
2004 Olympic Profile – Eideisis Ellinika 

1983 births
Living people
Greek male swimmers
Olympic swimmers of Greece
Swimmers at the 2004 Summer Olympics
Greek male freestyle swimmers
Swimmers from Athens

Mediterranean Games silver medalists for Greece
Mediterranean Games bronze medalists for Greece
Swimmers at the 2005 Mediterranean Games
Mediterranean Games medalists in swimming